Reddyanus heimi is a species of scorpion in the family Buthidae.

References

Animals described in 1976
heimi
Scorpions of Australia